"Stop Breathing" is a song by American rapper Roddy Ricch, released on September 30, 2022, as the lead single from his third mixtape Feed Tha Streets III (2022). It was produced by Turbo, JetsonMade, Pooh Beatz, and Shottie.

Composition and lyrics
In the song, Roddy Ricch rap-sings about the wealth and material possessions that he has obtained as a result of his success: "Look out the window, what do I see? / A couple yachts, they got some thots that trot the seven seas / Got CCs and Louis Vs out of every season/ Card me please, Forgis make 'em stop breathin'". Moreover, he mentions receiving a Ferrari from Mustard and being free from everyday struggles.

Music video
The music video was released alongside the single, and sees Roddy Ricch enjoying his prosperous lifestyle, such as boarding a jet and donning Louis Vuitton. The video also features clips of him with Post Malone at the Twelve Carat Tour.

Charts

References

2022 singles
2022 songs
Roddy Ricch songs
Songs written by Roddy Ricch
Songs written by Turbo (record producer)
Songs written by Post Malone
Atlantic Records singles